The British Columbia Party is a right-wing political party in the Canadian province of  British Columbia, founded in 1998 as a populist party by John Motiuk, a North Vancouver lawyer.

The party did not nominate candidates in the 2001 provincial election. It nominated two candidates for the 2005 provincial election: David Andrew Wright, who won 185 votes (0.86% of the total) in Delta North, and Jack Kortmeyer, who won 169 votes (1.39% of the total) in Bulkley Valley-Stikine. It did not nominate candidates in the 2009 provincial election.

The party was one of five whose members merged to form the British Columbia Unity Party, but like all but one of the others, the party later left BC Unity.

The party ran three candidates in the 2013 general election: Carra-Lynn Hodgson in North Vancouver-Lonsdale, Trevor Hendry in Skeena, and Jim Laurence in Surrey-White Rock.

It did not nominate candidates in the 2017 general election.

Leadership
The party was led by former Social Credit leader Eric Buckley.  Buckley was ousted by the party's board of directors, and replaced by former Reform Party of BC Leader Wilf Hanni.

Hanni was subsequently ousted by the board and replaced by Grant Mitton.  Mitton, a popular former radio talk show host, had run as a candidate for Social Credit in 2001, winning over 17% of the vote in his riding. He left the moribund Socreds to join the British Columbia Party as a "traditional conservative party", hoping to attract support from conservatives, particularly social conservatives dissatisfied with the policies of the ruling British Columbia Liberal Party.

Mitton and Hanni left the BC Party, and joined the British Columbia Conservative Party.

Party program

Founding philosophy
The philosophy of the British Columbia Party is rooted in traditional conservatism: the protection and preservation of whatever is beneficial, respect for the individual, economic responsibility, and government which is enabling, not restrictive. Essential components of the philosophy:
 Honouring the will of the people as the highest authority in a democratic society, obeying the mandate of the majority while respecting the rights and opinions of the minority.
 Recognition that the individual is the most important element in an organized society, and that government must protect individual citizens' inalienable rights and remain responsive to their potential and their needs.
 Responsible management of public affairs by government, to achieve the objectives of the electorate, ensuring that what is physically possible and morally correct is financially viable.
 Security of person and property.
 Belief in the supremacy of God and the rule of law as declared in the Constitution of Canada.

Policy and principles

 While members of the legislature are responsible primarily to their constituents, they must vote in accordance with party principles. In issues not guided by party principles, they must be allowed to vote freely, in accordance with their consciences and the best interests of their constituents.
 The executive, legislative and judicial branches of government and all their members will be held fully accountable for the execution of their duties and all their activities in the public arena.
 The government is responsible for protecting the rights and freedoms of all citizens. These include the right to life; freedoms of religion, speech, assembly, association and movement; the right to own private property, and equality before the law.
 Taxes must be responsible and fair. A balanced budget must be maintained.
 The private sector is recognized as the most effective and equitable area for job creation and economic stability.
 A balanced labour/management relationship must be maintained to encourage investment and stimulate job creation.
 There must be simultaneous and coordinated management of natural resources and protection of the environment to provide maximum sustainable benefit for the citizens of British Columbia.
 Social security and supporting infrastructure must balance the roles of government, individuals and charities, with services provided efficiently and effectively.
 An educational system providing the highest standards of academic opportunities must be universally available, with full public funding for the education of every minor and freedom for parents to choose the mode of education most suitable to each child's individual needs within that system.
  A comprehensive health care system must be based on accessibility and portability for the user, affordability and accountability for the government. Priority health care disbursements will be given to essential services.

See also

 List of political parties in Canada

References

Provincial political parties in British Columbia
Conservative parties in Canada
Burnaby
1998 establishments in British Columbia
Political parties established in 1998